Palms station is an elevated light rail station on the E Line of the Los Angeles Metro Rail system. The station is located over the intersection of National Boulevard and Palms Boulevard in the Palms neighborhood of Los Angeles, after which the station is named.

History 

Bay View was a stop on the Los Angeles and Independence Railroad. It was renamed The Palms in 1886.

Used in many motion pictures, the building eventually fell into disrepair and abandonment but was declared a Los Angeles Historic-Cultural Monument in 1963. A grassroots organization, S.O.S. (Save Our Station), moved it in February 1976 to the Heritage Square Museum grounds in the Montecito Heights community of the Arroyo Seco. It now serves as the museum's gift shop and visitor center.

Station name 
Originally slated to be renamed "National/Palms" on re-opening, it remains "Palms" as a result of a request by the Palms Neighborhood Council.
The council's resolution stated that:

the Pacific Line Palms station was an important landmark on the west side of the city, and the community that grew around it is one of the oldest on the west side of Los Angeles. Our stakeholders feel the naming of the station is not only an important branding opportunity for Palms, but an opportunity for Los Angeles to reinstate a link to the history in one of its oldest and most diverse communities.

On April 25, 2013, the Metro board of directors voted in favor of  "Palms" as the official name of the station.

Service

Station layout 

The station location is adjacent to I-10, just west of the three-way intersection of National, Palms and Exposition boulevards and perched on an embankment above National Boulevard.  Access is provided by stairs and elevators at the east end of the station.

Construction incorporated an existing steel bridge from the Air Line era and added a new concrete bridge, both immediately east of the station over the National/Palms intersection, as well as re-using an existing rail tunnel west of the station.

Hours and frequency 
E Line trains run every day between approximately 4:30 a.m. and 12:30 am. Trains operate every ten minutes during peak hours Monday through Friday, every twelve minutes during the daytime on weekdays and all day on the weekends after approximately 8 a.m. (with 15 to 20-minute headways early Saturday and Sunday mornings). Night service is every 20 minutes.

Connections 
, the following connections are available:
 Big Blue Bus (Santa Monica): 5, 17

Points of interest
Attractions within walking distance of Palms Station:
 Moreton Bay Fig Tree (Los Angeles, California)

References

External links 
 Metro.net: Metro Expo Line website
 Metro.net: "More to Explore, 7 New Expo Line Stations" — opened 20 May 2016.
Metro Expo Line Construction Authority website — all projects.
Metro Rail Expo Corridor, Phase 2 Project Website — opened 20 May 2016.
Youtube.com: Location of old Palms Station — seen on time lapse video of pre−upgraded section of  line from near Robertson Boulevard northwest through Palms and Cheviot Hills to Pico Boulevard.

E Line (Los Angeles Metro) stations
Palms, Los Angeles
Railway stations in Los Angeles
Westside (Los Angeles County)
Railway stations in the United States opened in 2016
2016 establishments in California
Pacific Electric stations